There were seven special elections to the United States House of Representatives in 1969 to the 91st United States Congress.

List of elections 
Elections are listed by date and district.

|- 
| 
| Robert A. Everett
|  | Democratic
| 1958 
|  | Incumbent died January 26, 1969.New member elected March 25, 1969.Democratic hold.
| nowrap | 

|- 
| 
| Melvin Laird
|  | Republican
| 1952
|  | Incumbent resigned January 21, 1969 to become U.S. Secretary of Defense.New member elected April 1, 1969.Democratic gain.
| nowrap | 

|- 
| 
| Edwin Reinecke
|  | Republican
| 1964
|  | Incumbent resigned January 21, 1969 to become Lieutenant Governor of California.New member elected April 29, 1969.Republican hold.
| nowrap | 

|-
| 
| James F. Battin
|  | Republican
| 1960
|  | Incumbent resigned February 27, 1969 to become Judge of the United States District Court for the District of Montana.New member elected June 24, 1969.Democratic gain.
| nowrap | 

|- 
| 
| William H. Bates
|  | Republican
| 1960 
|  | Incumbent died June 22, 1969.New member elected September 30, 1969.Democratic gain.
| nowrap | 

|- 
| 
| Charles S. Joelson
|  | Democratic
| 1960
|  | Incumbent resigned September 4, 1969 to become judge of Superior Court of New Jersey.New member elected November 4, 1969.Democratic hold.
| nowrap | 

|-
| 
| Donald Rumsfeld
|  | Republican
| 1962
|  | Incumbent resigned May 25, 1969 to become Director of the Office of Economic Opportunity.New member elected November 25, 1969.Republican hold.
| nowrap | 

|}

References 

 
1969